The 2000 Parramatta Eels season was the 54th in the club's history. Coached by Brian Smith and captained by Nathan Cayless, they competed in the National Rugby League's 2000 Telstra Premiership.

Summary
Parramatta finished an inconsistent 2000 season in seventh place. However, in the first week of the Finals series, Parramatta was involved in a big upset, defeating the second placed Sydney Roosters 32–8 at the Sydney Football Stadium. It must be noted though that there was only three points which separated the two clubs on the competition ladder.

The Parramatta side managed to repeat the result against local rivals Penrith the next week in a comfortable 28–10 win in front of 25,746 at the same venue, meaning that the club reached their third straight NRL Preliminary Final. Parramatta were looking to make it "Third Time Lucky" against the former NRL premiers, Brisbane Broncos, but it ended up to be "Third Time Unlucky" as the Broncos won the match 16–10. Parramatta were known throughout the 2000 season as the "Baby Eels" due to the club having only eight players in the entire squad who were over the age of 25.

Standings

Awards
Michael Cronin clubman of the year award: Michael Vella
Ken Thornett Medal (Players' player): Nathan Hindmarsh
Jack Gibson Award (Coach's award): Brett Hodgson
Eric Grothe Rookie of the Year Award: Andrew Ryan

References

Parramatta Eels seasons
Parramatta Eels